Church of St. Dominic is a Catholic church in Lisbon, Portugal. It is classified as a National Monument.

The church was dedicated in 1241 and was, at one time, the largest church in Lisbon. Prior to the establishment of the modern Portuguese republic in 1910, the church typically hosted Portuguese royal weddings. Formerly the home of the Inquisition, Jesuit missionary Gabriel Malagrida was famously executed at the church in 1761 after being accused of treason. In 1506, the church and the church square were the scenes of the Lisbon massacre when thousands of New Christians (previously converted Jews) were murdered by the Christian mob.

The church was damaged by the 1531 Lisbon earthquake and almost completely destroyed in the 1755 earthquake. Rebuilding began quickly but wasn't completed until 1807. In 1959 the church was devastated once more when a fire broke out in the building. The fire, which killed two firefighters, took more than six hours to extinguish and completely gutted the church, destroying many important paintings and statues. In 1994 the church reopened. The restoration left many signs of the fire in place.

See also
Procession of Our Lord of the Passion of Graça

References

Churches completed in 1241
Roman Catholic churches in Lisbon
National monuments in Lisbon District
Baroque church buildings in Portugal
1959 fires in Europe